The Land Beyond the Sunset is a 1912 short, silent drama film which tells the story of a young boy, oppressed by his grandmother, who goes on an outing in the country with a social welfare group. It stars Martin Fuller, Mrs. William Bechtel, Walter Edwin and Bigelow Cooper. Produced by Edison Studios in collaboration with the Fresh Air Fund, the screenplay was written by Dorothy G. Shore and directed by Harold M. Shaw.

In 2000, The Land Beyond the Sunset was selected for preservation in the United States National Film Registry by the Library of Congress as being "culturally, historically, or aesthetically significant". It is included on the DVD Treasures from American Film Archives (2000).

Plot

Joe is an impoverished New York newsboy who lives with his abusive grandmother. While selling papers, he is given a ticket for a children's excursion sponsored by the Fresh Air Fund. The next morning, Joe sneaks out of his tenement home to join the excursion, where he sees the countryside and the ocean for the first time. After a picnic, an adult volunteer reads to the children a fanciful tale from storybook, a tale about a young prince who is beaten by an old witch. A group of fairies rescues the boy, take him to a boat, and sail off for "the Land Beyond the Sunset, where he lived happily ever after." Joe imagines himself as the boy in the story. When the other children and adults begin their return to the city, Joe manages to get the book, linger, and then hide, afraid that his grandmother will be mad at him and dreading the prospect of returning to his wretched life in the city's slums. Next he wanders to the beach, where he finds a rowboat and decides to embark alone on a voyage to the wonderful, far-off land. He pushes the oarless boat into the water and climbs aboard. The film ends with a distant view of Joe, holding the storybook against his chest, slowly drifting out to sea toward the horizon and most likely to his death.

Cast
 Martin Fuller as Joe, the Newsboy
 Mrs. William Bechtel as Joe's Grandmother
 Walter Edwin as Manager of the Fresh Air Fund
 Ethel Jewett as Committee Woman
 Elizabeth Miller as Committee Woman
 Gladys Du Pell as Committee Woman
 Margery Bonney Erskine as Committee Woman (as Mrs. Wallace Erskine)
 Bigelow Cooper as The Minister

Production
The film was shot in studio at the Edison Company's plant at Decatur Avenue and Oliver Place in New York City, in the Bronx, as well as on location in a Bronx-area park that afforded a view of Long Island Sound.

References and notes

External links

The Land Beyond the Sunset  essay by Scott Simmon on the National Film Registry website

The Land Beyond the Sunset essay by Daniel Eagan in America's Film Legacy: The Authoritative Guide to the Landmark Movies in the National Film Registry, A&C Black, 2010 , pages 25–27 

1912 films
1912 drama films
Silent American drama films
American silent short films
American black-and-white films
United States National Film Registry films
1912 short films
Articles containing video clips
Edison Studios films
1910s American films